The Ministerial Functions Act 1969, is a Malaysian laws which enacted to make provisions for declaring the functions and the transfer of functions of Ministers, for declaring the styles and titles of Ministers, and for incidental and connected purposes.

Structure
The Ministerial Functions Act 1969, in its current form (1 June 2013), consists of only 5 sections and no schedule (including no amendment), without separate Part.
 Section 1: Short title
 Section 2: Functions, styles and titles of Ministers
 Section 3: Effect of transfer of functions and change of style and title
 Section 4: Reference in written laws
 Section 5: Repeal and saving

References

External links
 Ministerial Functions Act 1969 

1969 in Malaysian law
Malaysian federal legislation